David Brunton McDougall (1894 – 18 August 1918) was a Scottish professional football inside left who played in the Scottish Football League for St Bernard's.

Personal life 
McDougall served as a corporal in the King's Own Scottish Borderers during the First World War and was killed in action in Belgium on 18 August 1918. He is commemorated on the Ploegsteert Memorial.

References 

Scottish footballers
1918 deaths
British Army personnel of World War I
British military personnel killed in World War I
1894 births
King's Own Scottish Borderers soldiers
Scottish Football League players
Bonnyrigg Rose Athletic F.C. players
People from Leith
Association football inside forwards
St Bernard's F.C. players
Hibernian F.C. wartime guest players